The Bec du Corbeau (1,992 m) is a mountain of the Chablais Alps, overlooking Morgins in the Swiss canton of Valais. It lies west of Pointe de Bellevue, on the watershed between the valleys of the Dranse d'Abondance and Illiez. The French border runs west of the mountain.

References

External links
Bec du Corbeau on Hikr

Mountains of the Alps
Mountains of Valais
Mountains of Switzerland
One-thousanders of Switzerland